In the Beginning is an American sitcom originally created by Norman Lear, Jim Mulligan, and Norman Steinberg and produced by Lear's Tandem Productions company. The show aired on CBS from September 20 to October 18, 1978, and was cancelled after its first five episodes aired due to low ratings.

Premise
The series, a semi-update of the film Going My Way, featured conservative priest Father Cleary and liberal, streetwise nun Sister Agnes (known as "Aggie") running a ghetto mission together in Baltimore.

While Aggie was from the area and enjoyed the assignment, Father Cleary had difficulty dealing with her (frequently referring to her as "Attila the Nun"), as well as the neighborhood prostitutes, hustlers and winos.

Cast
McLean Stevenson as Father Cleary
Priscilla Lopez as Sister Agnes
Priscilla Morrill as Sister Lillian
Olivia Barash as Willie
Bobby Ellerbee as Jerome
Jack Dodson as Msgr. Barlow

Episodes

Production
First developed by Lear in 1977, the series was originally intended as a starring vehicle for Broadway actress Priscilla Lopez, and was to have been titled Aggie, after her character. However, McLean Stevenson was later added to the cast, and in addition to the title change, it also moved the show's focus from its original premise of Aggie against the establishment to Aggie and her battles with Father Cleary.

In the Beginning also marked McLean Stevenson's second attempt at a successful post-M*A*S*H vehicle. However, the series fared even worse than his short-lived 1976 sitcom The McLean Stevenson Show. A long-forgotten flop, In the Beginning was cancelled by CBS after only 5 of its 9 episodes had aired, due to poor ratings and the departures of co-creators Jim Mulligan and Norman Steinberg after the pilot, as a result of conflicts with the network. Stevenson's next show, Hello, Larry, another T.A.T. Communications Company production (albeit on NBC), premiered three months later and ran 15 months with Tandem's Diff'rent Strokes as a lead-in.

References

External links

1978 American television series debuts
1978 American television series endings
1970s American sitcoms
CBS original programming
English-language television shows
Religious comedy television series
Catholicism in fiction
Television series by Sony Pictures Television
Television series created by Norman Lear
Television shows set in Baltimore